This is a timeline of French history, comprising important legal changes and political events in France and its predecessor states. To read about the background to these events, see History of France. See also the list of Frankish kings, French monarchs, and presidents of France.

5th century

6th century

7th century

8th century

9th century

10th century

11th century

12th century

13th century

14th century

15th century

16th century

17th century

18th century

19th century

20th century

21st century

See also
 History of French foreign relations
 History of France
 :Category:Timelines of cities in France

References

Bibliography

In English
 Langer, William. An Encyclopedia of World History (5th ed. 1973); highly detailed outline of events online free
 Morris, Richard B. and Graham W. Irwin, eds. Harper Encyclopedia of the Modern World: A Concise Reference History from 1760 to the Present (1970) online
 
 
 
 Echard, William E. Historical Dictionary of the French Second Empire, 1852–1870 (1985)
 Hutton, Patrick H. and Amy J. Staples, et al. Historical Dictionary of the Third French Republic, 1870–1940 (2 vol 1986)
 Northcutt, M. Wayne. Historical Dictionary of the French Fourth and Fifth Republics, 1946–1991 (1992)
 Kibler, et al. Medieval France: An Encyclopedia (1995)

In French
  (+ via Google Books)
  (coverage includes France)
  (coverage includes France) (+ pt.1, pt.2 via Google Books)

External links
H-France free daily email discussions and book reviews; oriented to scholars & graduate students since 1991.
 
  (compiled circa 2000?)

 
 
France